Shine for Singapore (晴空万里) is a song commissioned for Singapore's National Day Parade, 2008. It is sung by Hady Mirza in English, while it is sung by Joi Chua in Mandarin.

External links 
NDP 2008 Theme Songs
Shine For Singapore MTV
Qing Kong Wan Li MTV

Singaporean songs
2008 songs